Donya is the second studio album by Iranian-Swedish pop singer of Iranian origin Arash. It was released in 2008.

Singles from this album were "Chori Chori", "Suddenly", "Kandi", "Donya", "Dasa Bala" and "Pure Love".

Track listing 
"Intro"
"Donya" (feat. Shaggy)
"Suddenly" (feat. Rebecca)
"Miduni Midunam"
"Kandi" (feat. Lumidee)
"Pure Love" (feat. Helena)
"Naro"
"Chori, Chori" (feat. Aneela)
"Laf, Laf"
"Joone Man"
"Tanham"
"Doset Nadaram"
"Dasa Bala" (feat. Timbuktu, Aylar & Yag)
"Donya" (Payami Break Mix) (feat. Shaggy)

Charts

Certifications

References 

2008 albums
Arash (singer) albums